Hahnel or Hähnel is a German surname. Notable people with the surname include:

Ernst Julius Hähnel (1811–1891), German sculptor
Jörg Hahnel (born 1982), German footballer
Paul Hahnel (1843–1887), German entomologist
Robin Hahnel (born 1946), American economist and academic

Surnames from nicknames
German-language surnames